Crowhurst is a 2017 British drama film directed by Simon Rumley, based on the true story of sailor Donald Crowhurst. Filming for the movie took place in Bristol during 2015 and the movie premiered on 15 September 2017 at the Oldenburg Film Festival.

Plot 
In October 1968, Donald Crowhurst, a 35-year-old engineer and father of four, embarked on one of the last great adventures of the 20th Century. He was one of nine men who set out from the English coast that autumn as part of the Sunday Times Golden Globe Race, chasing to be either the first or the fastest man to circumnavigate the globe – single-handed and non-stop. But for Donald the dream turned into a nightmare.

Cast 
 Justin Salinger as Donald Crowhurst
 Amy Loughton as Clare Crowhurst
 Edwin Flay as Peter Porter
 Glyn Dilley as Stanley Best
 Christopher Hale as Rodney Hallworth

Reception 
On review aggregator website Rotten Tomatoes, the film holds an approval rating of 78% based on 9 reviews, and an average rating of 6.3/10.

The Hollywood Reporter reviewed Crowhurst, stating that it was "an intriguing curio, for sure, but a minor addition to Rumley’s mind-bending canon." Kim Newman reviewed the movie for Screen International, praising Justin Salinger's portrayal of Crowhurst.

See also 
 The Mercy – 2018 film on the same subject directed by James Marsh and also distributed by Studio Canal
 Deep Water, a 2006 documentary on the subject

References

External links 
 

2017 films
Sterling Pictures films
British drama films
2010s English-language films
2010s British films